= Mongols in Russia =

Mongols in Russia can refer to:

- Kalmyks from Kalmykia
- Buryats from Buryatia
